The 2016 Cork Senior Hurling Championship was the 128th staging of the Cork Senior Hurling Championship since its establishment by the Cork County Board in 1887. The draw for the 2016 fixtures took place on 13 December 2015. The championship began on 15 May 2016 and ended on 15 October 2016.

Glen Rovers were the defending champions.

On 9 October 2016, Glen Rovers won the title following a 0-19 to 2-10 defeat of Erin's Own in the county final. This was their 27th championship title overall and their second in succession.

Championship details

Overview

All of the twenty-three teams from the 2015 championship will participate in the top tier of Cork hurling in 2016, along with some additions.

Divisional side Carrigdhoun, who withdrew on the eve of the 2015 championship, will field a team in the 2016 championship.

Newcestown, who defeated Valley Rovers by 1-23 to 0-8 in the final of the premier intermediate championship in 2015, gained automatic promotion to the senior championship.

Although Bishopstown defeated Killeagh by 1-20 to 1-11 in the 2015 relegation play-off, Killeagh were granted a reprieve and will remain in the senior grade for 2016.

New format

For the first time in Cork a double elimination format will be introduced. This will continue to give teams at least two games before being eliminated from the championship.

Fixtures/results

Preliminary round

Round 1

Round 2A

Round 2B

Round 3

Round 4

Relegation play-offs

Quarter-finals

Semi-finals

Final

Championship statistics

Top scorers

Overall

Single game

Miscellaneous

 Glen Rovers retained the title for the first time since 1960. They became the first team since Erin's Own in 2007 to retain the championship.

External links

 Cork GAA website

References

Cork Senior Hurling Championship
Cork Senior Hurling Championship